Ivaturi Shivram (born 23 July 1954) is a former Indian cricket umpire. He stood in nine ODI games between 1994 and 2002.

See also
 List of One Day International cricket umpires

References

1954 births
Living people
Indian One Day International cricket umpires
Cricketers from Chennai